The Cork Premier Junior Football Championship (known for sponsorship reasons as the Bon Secours Cork Premier Junior Football Championship and abbreviated to the Cork PJFC) is scheduled to be an annual Gaelic football competition organised by the Cork County Board of the Gaelic Athletic Association and contested by the top-ranking junior clubs in the county of Cork in Ireland. It is the fifth tier overall in the entire Cork football championship system.

The Cork Premier Junior Championship will be introduced in 2023 following a restructuring of the various intermediate and junior championships.

In its soon-to-be-introduced format, the Cork Premier Junior Championship will begin in late summer. The 12 participating club teams will be divided into three groups of four teams and play each other in a round-robin system. The three group winners and the three runners-up will proceed to the knockout phase that culminates with the final match. The winner of the Cork Premier Junior Championship will qualify for the subsequent Munster Club Championship.

History

A restructuring process of the entire Cork football championship system had been underway since voted on by Cork County Board delegates in March 2019. In February 2022, the County Board took a further vote on the future of the club junior and intermediate championships. Delegates voted in favour of creating the Premier Junior Championship, comprising teams formed by the bottom four teams in Intermediate A football in 2022 along with the eight Divisional JAFC winners from 2022.

Format

Group stage
The 12 teams are divided into three groups of four. Over the course of the group stage, each team plays once against the others in the group, resulting in each team being guaranteed at least three games. Two points are awarded for a win, one for a draw and zero for a loss. The teams are ranked in the group stage table by points gained, then scoring difference and then their head-to-head record. The top two teams in each group qualify for the knockout stage.

Knockout stage
Quarter-finals: Two lone quarter-finals featuring the four lowest-placed qualifying teams from the group stage. Two teams qualify for the next round.

Semi-finals: The two quarter-final winners and the top two highest-placed qualifying teams from the group stage contest this round. The two winners from these games advance to the final.

Final: The two semi-final winners contest the final. The winning team are declared champions.

Promotion and relegation
At the end of the championship, the winning team is automatically promoted to the Cork Intermediate A Championship for the following season. The two worst-ranked teams from the group stage take part in a playoff, with the losing team being relegated to their divisional junior championship.

Teams

2023 Teams

References

 
1
Junior Gaelic football county championships